The Canadian Screen Award for Best Supporting Actress in Comedy Series is an annual Canadian television award, presented by the Academy of Canadian Cinema and Television to the best performance by an actress in a supporting role in a Canadian television comedy series.

The award was first presented in 2011. Prior to that date, the Academy presented awards for Individual Performance in a Comedy Series and Ensemble Performance in a Comedy Series, differentiating neither by gender nor for the distinction between lead and supporting performances.

In August 2022, the Academy announced that beginning with the 11th Canadian Screen Awards in 2023, a gender-neutral award for Best Supporting Performance in a Comedy Series will be presented.

2010s

2020s

References

Best Supporting Actress, Comedy Series